"American Baby" is a song by American rock band Dave Matthews Band, released as the first single from their sixth studio album Stand Up. The song encourages Americans not to lose their culture in the midst of political and social trouble. It peaked number 16 on Billboard Hot 100, making their highest-charting single in the United States. A music video was also filmed for the song and premiered on April 18, 2005 on VH1.

The song is also featured on the band's greatest hits album, The Best of What's Around Vol. 1.

Track listing
iTunes digital single
"American Baby" – 4:36

American radio promo
"American Baby" (radio edit) – 3:42
"American Baby" (album version) – 4:36
Suggested callout hook – 0:10

EC promo single CD
"American Baby" (radio edit) – 3:42
"American Baby" (album version) – 4:35

Charts

References

2005 singles
Dave Matthews Band songs
Music videos directed by Dave Meyers (director)
Songs written by Mark Batson
Songs written by Dave Matthews
2005 songs
Song recordings produced by Mark Batson
RCA Records singles
Songs written by Carter Beauford
Songs written by Stefan Lessard
Songs written by LeRoi Moore
Songs written by Boyd Tinsley